Owja Bon (also Romanized as Owjā Bon and Ūjāben; also known as Ūhāben) is a village in Anjirabad Rural District, in the Central District of Gorgan County, Golestan Province, Iran. At the 2006 census, its population was 769, in 186 families.

References 

Populated places in Gorgan County